Handxom S.A. is a Haitian technology company headquartered in Pétion-Ville, Haiti. It designs, develops, and sells computer hardware and consumer electronics, most notably, tablet computers.

See also
 Comparison of tablet computers

References

2013 establishments in Haiti
Companies based in Port-au-Prince
Companies established in 2013
Computer companies of Haiti
Portable audio player manufacturers
Haitian brands
Pétion-Ville